Hassan Hajgozar born April 1, 1971, in Tehran) is an Iranian film director. He started directing theater in 1988.  He has directed documentaries and fiction films.  He is also a producer and scriptwriter.

Filmography

As a director and scriptwriter

As a director and series

References

Living people
1971 births
People from Tehran